Dora Observatory is on the South Korean side of the 38th parallel.  Situated on top of Dorasan (Mount Dora) in Paju, the observatory provides scenic views across the Demilitarized Zone.  Visitors can see the North Korean territory through binoculars from the 304 square feet, 500-person capacity observatory. They are able to see the North Korean propaganda village situated in the DMZ, and can also see the city of Kaesong.  The observatory is very close to the Third North Korean Infiltration Tunnel dug by North Koreans into the South.  The Dorasan Station, also nearby, is designed to be the station that connects the railroads of the South and North one day in the future.

See also
 Daeseong-dong

External links
 Life in Korea

Tourist attractions in Gyeonggi Province
Buildings and structures in Paju